Revenge of the Judoon is a BBC Books original novella written by Terrance Dicks and based on the long-running British science fiction television series Doctor Who. It features the Tenth Doctor and his companion Martha Jones. This paperback is part of the Quick Reads Initiative sponsored by the UK government, to encourage literacy. It has a similar look to BBC Books' other new series adventures, except for its much shorter word count, being a paperback and not being numbered as part of the same series. To date it is the one of only five novels based upon the revived series that have not been published in hardcover: the first, I am a Dalek, was published in May 2006; the second, Made of Steel, was published in March 2007; the fourth, The Sontaran Games, was published in February 2009; and the fifth, Code of the Krillitanes, was published in March 2010. These four books are also part of the Quick Reads Initiative.

The book sees the return of the Judoon, who were first seen in the third series episode "Smith and Jones", and again in "The Stolen Earth". The presence of Martha Jones as the Doctor's companion indicates it takes place prior to the trilogy of episodes that ended the third season of the revived Doctor Who the previous year, in which Martha Jones departed as the Doctor's companion.

See also

Whoniverse

External links
  BBC Press Release

2008 British novels
2008 science fiction novels
British science fiction novels
Tenth Doctor novels
Novels by Terrance Dicks
BBC Books books
Cultural depictions of Arthur Conan Doyle